Lyshorntunnelen (English: Lyshorn Tunnel) is a 9.3-kilometre-long (5.7 mi) motorway tunnel connecting the municipalities of Bergen and Bjørnafjorden in Vestland county, Norway. The tunnel has two tubes with a total of four lanes and a speed limit of 100 km/h. It is the longest motorway tunnel in Norway and is one the four tunnels on the Svegatjørn-Rådal stretch of E39.

References 

 E39 Svegatjørn–Rådal er åpnet | Statens vegvesen. Retrieved 16 February 2023

European route E39 in Norway